Richard M. Weiner (6 February 1930 – 13 August 2020) was a professor of theoretical physics at the University of Marburg in Marburg, Germany and an associate of the Laboratoire de Physique Théorique at Paris-Sud 11 University in Orsay, France.

Biography
Weiner was born 1930 in Cernăuți, former Romania (presently Chernivtsi, Ukraine). He was a survivor of the Chernivtsi ghetto.

Weiner got his PhD in Physics at the University of Bucharest in 1958, and from 1951 to 1968 he worked as a research scientist at the Physics Institute of the Romanian Academy of Sciences. Because of his intention to leave the Romanian communist regime, he was retrograded and denied an exit visa, being one of the first refuseniks of Central and Eastern Europe. His 1969 flight from communist Romania and joining CERN made headlines in the media.

Work
Richard Weiner predicted the isomeric shift which has found wide applications in many fields of physics. He also predicted the hot spot effect in subatomic physics and has made contributions to the theory of Bose–Einstein correlations being also the author of the only textbook on Bose–Einstein correlations. He was the initiator and co-organizer of the series of meetings LESIP. He also published a book titled Analogies in Physics and Life, A scientific Autobiography.).

He supervised Ph.D. theses by Norbert Stelte, Michael Plümer, Udo Ornik, Fernando Navara, Bernhard Schlei, and Nelly Arbex, and had as Postdoctoral collaborators among others Sibaji Raha, Apostolos Vourdas, Fred Pottag, and Leonid Razumov.

Weiner had over 180 publications in scientific journals and books. He also published a science-fiction novel in German Das Miniatom-Projekt. He was asked for interviews, among others by the Frankfurter Rundschau and was invited by Hessischer Rundfunk within the series Doppelkopf dedicated to renowned personalities.

Books authored

Books edited

References

External links
 Homepage of Richard M. Weiner
 Richard M. Weiner, Introduction to Bose–Einstein Correlations and Subatomic Interferometry, John Wiley, 2000. 
 Richard M. Weiner, Das Miniatom-Projekt (in German) 2007.
 http://www.nzz.ch/magazin/buchrezensionen/chaotische_kettenreaktionen_1.577158.html
 Analogies in Physics and Life, A Scientific Autobiography, World Scientific 2008. 
Scientific publications of Richard M. Weiner on INSPIRE-HEP

1930 births
2020 deaths
Scientists from Chernivtsi
Romanian Jews
Nazi-era ghetto inmates
University of Bucharest alumni
Romanian physicists
20th-century German physicists
People associated with CERN
Academic staff of the University of Marburg